Suontee (also: Suonteejärvi) is a rather large lake in Finland. The northern part of the lake is located in the region of Central Finland, and the southern part in the region of Southern Savonia. The southern part is in a more natural state with very clear water, and it is included in the Natura 2000 conservation network of the EU. The protection area is 2 625 hectare. A typical bird there is the black-throated loon. In the past two big lakes, Suontee and Puula, were one lake until 1854, when the water level was lowered 2.5 meters. This has brought up geological stacks, which are formed by water.

See also
List of lakes in Finland

References
 Suontee in Järviwiki. Accessed 10 February 2014.
 Natura-area of Suontee. Finnish Environmental Administration. Accessed 10 February 2014.

External links

Landforms of Central Finland
Lakes of Joutsa
Lakes of Hirvensalmi
Lakes of Pertunmaa